The Rizal Memorial Coliseum is an indoor arena in the Rizal Memorial Sports Complex in Manila, Philippines. It can hold up to 6,100 people.

History

The Rizal Memorial Coliseum within the Rizal Memorial Sports Complex was built on the former site of Manila Carnival Grounds in 1934 as a tennis stadium named "Rizal Memorial Tennis Stadium", but was later renamed “Rizal Memorial Coliseum” at an unknown time. It became a primary venue for the UAAP and the NCAA, before moving to much-larger venues such as the Araneta Coliseum. It was one of the buildings that were destroyed during the Battle of Manila of World War II in 1945 and was reconstructed in 1953 for the 1954 Asian Games. It was also one of the venues of now-defunct Metropolitan Basketball Association (MBA) as the home court of the Manila Metrostars during the inaugural season in 1998.

2019 renovation and restoration
The venue was used and renovated for the 2019 Southeast Asian Games. The renovation was funded from the  given by the Philippine Amusement and Gaming Corporation to the Philippine Sports Commission. Renovation work which will cover both the interior and exterior of the facility began on July 8, 2019, after getting approval from three government agencies, the National Commission for Culture and the Arts (NCCA), the National Historical Commission of the Philippines (NHCP), and the National Museum of the Philippines (NMP). ME Sicat Construction is the contractor for the renovation project which secured its role through bidding. ME Sicat hired the service of heritage conservationist and architect Gerard Lico for the renovation. Unlike the previous renovations which were minor, for the first time since the rebuilt of the 
coliseum in 1953, the renovation will be a major overhaul. The renovation process includes near restoration of the building to its state in the 1930s and the installation of new plastic seats and retractable seating system, flooring, plumbing, fireproofing, electrical system and for the first time in coliseum's history, air conditioning system, while keeping the original look of the building designed by Juan Arellano. Lico and his team used the archival materials by the collectors to restore its original design including from Jorge B. Vargas (who was a founding member of the Philippine Amateur Athletic Federation and the first Filipino member of the International Olympic Committee). Part of its restoration are the repainting of the coliseum's color back into its original which is based from using paint scraping of the building, removals of add-on canopy that was added during the 1970s, metal dividers at the entrance, and wire mesh that separated the spectator area, discoveries of some of its original designs that were covered or removed during its previous renovations (such as the porthole windows and two side rooms at the lobby, and grillworks that bears the letters "T" and "S", referring the coliseum's original name), replacement of faux marble into a real marble, replacement of grillworks to floor-to-ceiling glass at the entrances, the addition of the art-deco style elements on its locker and comfort rooms and the addition of a replica of the original lightning fixtures at the main entrance which was removed during its previous renovations. Also part of its restoration is the gallery room which is the exhibit of the old photographs, tickets and posters of some notable events held at the Rizal Memorial Sports Complex that are part of Vargas' collection. Lico revealed that he spend his own money for the gallery room as it was not included of the renovation budget and he insisted to include it to make people connect with the importance history of the complex. He added that the three government agencies didn't want the idea of gallery room but ME Sicat convinced them to approve it. As for the installation of the air conditioning system for the first time, Lico and his team removed the building's blowers, vents, and exhaust fans and covered the ceiling with a two-inch foaming insulation to absorb outdoor noise. They installed the ducts of the air-conditioning which are all in industrial style to match with the building's interior and also evocative of ocean liners, a significant element of industrialization during the 1930s. The renovation made its capacity decreased from 8,000 to only 6,100. The restoration work of the coliseum is in accordance to the plan by the NHCP, the agency which declared the complex as a "National Historical Landmark". 285 workers are working for the renovation around the clock in 3 shifts. This led both the UAAP and the NCAA expressed interest to hold their respective games on the coliseum again. After only four months, the renovation was completed on November 27, 2019. The coliseum hosted the gymnastics competitions during the biennial games.

Previous proposed plans
The Philippine Sports Commission (PSC) unveiled plans for the conversion of the Rizal Memorial Coliseum into a Philippine Sports Museum and the Asian Games Museum which houses the memorabilia of Philippine and Asian sports icons and hall of famers. The current location of the PSM is located at the second floor of the PSC building inside the Rizal Memorial Sports Complex. There was a plan to demolish the site before the PSC's announcement.

On November 22, 2016, then-Manila Mayor Joseph Estrada announced that the city government is making a partnership with businessman Enrique Razon to convert the Rizal Memorial Sports Complex (which includes a coliseum) into a commercial center which will include a mall and cinemas. The plan was to build-up contemporary buildings and commercial structures with modern smart technologies and amenities, as well as more greener open spaces within the property. A sports museum would also be construct here, while the facade of the Rizal Memorial Coliseum would be retained. The plan was criticized by various heritage and athletes groups with an online petition posted on Change.org was initiated to save the Rizal Memorial Sports Complex amid several reports on the planned redevelopment. The plan was also criticized by the Heritage Conservation Society, questioning if Manila needs another shopping mall. The National Commission for Culture and the Arts  also stated that the city government of Estrada never consulted the agency regarding their plans on the sports venue in particular despite promising to cooperate with the government body on cultural conservation in a meeting initiated by the Manila government in May 2016. Estrada defended the redevelopment of the RMSC, said that no one uses the complex anymore and it became old, and antiquated.

However, in April 2017, the sports complex was declared as a National Historical Landmark by the National Historical Commission of the Philippines and an Important Cultural Property by the National Museum of the Philippines ensuring the site's preservation due to the National Cultural Heritage Act. Because of the declaration, the Razon group later dropped its bid to redevelop the complex and the Philippine Sports Commission halted its negotiations with the Manila City government on the planned sale of RMSC, instead it will be focused now on rehabilitating the sports complex. On August 7, 2019, both the PSC and the Manila City government (now under the administration of Mayor Isko Moreno) agreed to not selling the complex.

Architecture and design
Juan Arellano was the architect responsible for the design of the Rizal Memorial Sports Complex including the Rizal Memorial Coliseum. The Rizal Memorial Coliseum exhibits an Art Deco style architecture, particularly Streamline Moderne.

See also 
Rizal Memorial Sports Complex
Rizal Memorial Stadium
Rizal Memorial Baseball Stadium
Ninoy Aquino Stadium
PhilSports Arena
Smart Araneta Coliseum
Mall of Asia Arena
Philippine Arena

References 

Sports venues in Manila
Indoor arenas in the Philippines
Basketball venues in the Philippines
Art Deco architecture in the Philippines
Streamline Moderne architecture
Buildings and structures in Malate, Manila
Sports venues completed in 1934
1934 establishments in the Philippines
Juan M. Arellano buildings